"Crazy About You" is the tenth single of the Morning Musume subgroup Minimoni. It was released on October 16, 2003 and sold 36,473 copies. It peaked at number five on the Oricon Charts in Japan.

Track listing 
All tracks are written and composed by Tsunku.
 "Crazy About You"

Featured lineup 
 Mika Todd
 Nozomi Tsuji
 Ai Kago
 Ai Takahashi

References

External links 
 "Crazy About You" entry on the Hello! Project official website 

Zetima Records singles
Minimoni songs
2003 singles
Songs written by Tsunku
Song recordings produced by Tsunku
Japanese-language songs